Armour & Co v. Wantock, 323 U.S. 126 (1944), is a US labor law case, concerning the minimum wage.

Facts
Wantock and his colleagues claimed they should be paid the minimum wage for time spent on call as firefighters. Armour and Co had a soap factory in Chicago, but was also in insurance, and had a private firefighting force to supplement the City's. Between 8am and 5pm the firefighters had occasional tasks of inspecting, cleaning, and keeping in order the company's firefighting apparatus, which included fire engines, hose, pumps, water barrels and buckets, extinguishers, and a sprinkler system. They remained on call as firefighters. Their tasks took up half an hour a week, and otherwise they had 'cooking equipment, beds, radios, and facilities for cards and amusements with which the men slept, ate, or entertained themselves pretty much as they chose.'

Judgment
Justice Jackson wrote for the majority and held that the firefighters' time on call was working even if chatting or playing cards. Value in having employees ready and limiting free movement.

See also

United States labor law

References

External links
 

United States labor case law
United States Supreme Court cases
United States Supreme Court cases of the Stone Court
1944 in United States case law